Arthur Nicholas "Sas" de Kock (11 January 1866 – 6 July 1957) was a South African international rugby union winger. Born in Hopetown, he attended Paul Roos Gymnasium before playing provincial rugby for Griqualand West. He made his only appearance for South Africa during Great Britain's 1891 tour, South Africa's first as a Test nation. He was selected to play in the 2nd match of the three Test series, Great Britain won the game 3–0. de Kock died in 1957, in Springs, at the age of 91.

References

1866 births
1957 deaths
People from Thembelihle Local Municipality
Afrikaner people
South Africa international rugby union players
South African rugby union players
Rugby union players from the Northern Cape
Rugby union wings
Griquas (rugby union) players